RBD is a Mexican Latin pop group that gained popularity from Televisa's telenovela Rebelde (2004–06). The group was composed of Alfonso Herrera, Anahí, Christian Chávez, Dulce María, Maite Perroni and Christopher von Uckermann. The group achieved international success from 2004 until their separation in 2009 and sold over 15 million records worldwide, making them one of the best-selling Latin music artists of all time.

In November 2004, the group released their debut studio album, Rebelde, to great success. In September 2005, the group released their second album, Nuestro Amor, receiving their first Latin Grammy Award nomination at the 2006 ceremony. In 2006, the group released their third album, Celestial. The album's lead single, "Ser o Parecer", topped the Billboard Hot Latin Songs chart for two consecutive weeks. This was their first album to be released simultaneously in all countries. In the same year, the group released their fourth album, and first English-language album titled Rebels. In 2007, the group released their fifth album  Empezar Desde Cero, which was nominated at the Latin Grammy Awards. In 2009, the group released their sixth and final album, Para Olvidarte De Mí.

RBD officially formed on October 30, 2004, and announced on August 15, 2008, through a press release, that they would disband on March 10, 2009. In September 2020 the band announced they would reunite through a virtual show in December, and their music was released on digital platforms the same month. Only four of the original members returned: Maite Perroni, Anahí, Christopher Von Uckermann and Christian Chavez. Almost three years later on January 19, 2023 they announced all members would get back together for a one-off tour with the exception of Alfonso Herrera.

History

2004–2005: Rebelde and Nuestro Amor 

RBD (abbreviation for "ReBelDe" • ) formed on October 30, 2004, which followed the premiere of the Mexican soap opera Rebelde (produced by Pedro Damian and adapted from the original argentinian creation of Chris Morena's "Rebelde Way"). The members were Anahí, Alfonso Herrera, Dulce María, Christopher von Uckermann, Maite Perroni and Christian Chávez. The band released their debut single, "Rebelde", exactly one month before the group officially formed. Their debut album of the same name was released on November 11, 2004, by EMI. All four singles from the album were number-one hits in Mexico.

 
Rebelde sold well in the United States, reaching number 95 on the Billboard 200 and number two on the Latin Albums chart. In July 2005, a live CD/DVD, Tour Generación RBD En Vivo, was released. The CD/DVD documented their tour around Mexico that included 45 sold-out concerts across the country, including sixteen in Mexico City. In Spain, Rebelde spent five weeks on the top of the charts and was certified 3× Platinum for having sold over 240,000 copies.

With the success of the telenovela, the group used the hiatus between the first and second season to release their second album Nuestro Amor, on September 22, 2005. This album included twelve songs plus "Una Canción", a live recording, and "Liso, Sensual", a studio version of the song previously performed on their last tour. The album set new record sales in Mexico, selling 127,000 copies on its release day and 160,000 copies in its first week. In the U.S., the album topped the Latin Albums chart for three weeks and peaked at number 88 on the Billboard 200. The first four singles reached number one in Mexico. In the U.S., "Nuestro Amor", "Aún hay algo" and "Este corazón" charted on the Hot Latin Songs chart at numbers six, 24 and 10, respectively. Nuestro Amor was certified 2× Platinum in Spain. In November 2005, a Portuguese version of their debut album was released, titled Rebelde (Edição Brasil).

2006–2007: Celestial and Rebels 
In early 2006, the group went on tour across the United States for the first time, which was recorded and released as a CD/DVD in April 2006, titled Live in Hollywood. It peaked at number six on the Latin Albums chart. Since that year, former singer Lynda Thomas, who had been uncredited with the group since their debut, officially became a recurring contributor for them. The first song credited to her was "No Pares", performed by Dulce María.
 
In May 2006, the group released a Portuguese version of Nuestro Amor, titled Nosso Amor Rebelde, targeted for the Brazilian market. Nosso Amor Rebelde is their second album in Portuguese, released only in Brazil. The album contains Portuguese versions of 11 songs from Nuestro Amor. The album, however, did not have a full week of album sales because of its Friday release. Despite this, it became their first album to peak or chart in the top 20 of the Billboard 200. RBD was nominated for the Latin Grammy Awards in 2006 in the category Best Pop Album by a Group or Duo for Nuestro Amor. They performed a new version of "Tras de mí" at the ceremony.

In November 2006, the group released their third album, Celestial, produced and directed by Carlos Lara and Armando Ávila. The album debuted at number 15 on the Billboard 200 with over 137,000 copies sold in the United States in its first week. The album spawned three hit singles, "Ser o Parecer", "Celestial" and "Bésame sin miedo". In Spain, Celestial was certified Platinum.

One month later, in December 2006 a Portuguese-language edition of the album was released for the Brazilian market called Celestial (Versão Brasil). This third album in Portuguese was the first to be recorded in Brazil. From their tour in Brazil, the group released a DVD titled Live in Rio (2007). The group were also honored for selling over 2.5 million copies of their albums and DVD's in the country. That same month, the group released their fourth album and first English-language album, Rebels, which debuted at number 40 on the Billboard 200 with 94,000 copies sold in its first week. Rebels was certified Gold in Japan for having sold over 250,000 copies.

The group was nominated twice in the category "Latin Pop Album of the Year By a Duo or Group", with Celestial and Live in Hollywood. They also received a nomination for "Top Latin Albums Artist of the Year" and "Latin Tour of the Year" for Tour Generación RBD. The show was held on April 26 in Miami, Florida. They won in all categories they were nominated in. Celestial won the former award.

2008–2009: Empezar Desde Cero and Para Olvidarte De Mí 
On March 2, 2007, Chávez revealed he is gay after pictures were discovered of him marrying another man in Canada. In a letter on the group's website, he asked fans for understanding and acceptance. After this, the group worked two side-projects; Sálvame, an organization that helps homeless youth get an education and shelter, and RBD: La Familia, their new sitcom. The group was nominated four times in three categories for the 2007 Billboard Latin Music Awards.

In early 2007, the group began to rehearse for their upcoming concert tour called Tour Celestial, which started in Ecuador on April 20, 2007. On May 28, 2007, Donald Trump invited the group to perform three songs at the Miss Universe 2007 finals in Mexico City. They performed a medley of "Wanna Play", "Cariño Mio" and "Money Money" at the event. In June 2007, the group recorded the accompanying music video for their single "Bésame sin miedo" in Transylvania while on tour in Romania where Celestial was released. It was the same year they were chosen to headline a series of Pepsi commercials with The Black Eyed Peas to air in South America and Spanish-speaking countries. On July 19, 2007, the group performed "Bésame sin miedo" at the Premios Juventud 2007 ceremony and won seven awards that night, including "Voice of the Moment" and "Favorite Concert". RBD broke the record for most albums in the top 20 in Brazil, having three different albums in the top 20 for the week ending January 20, 2007. Their single "Tu amor" was nominated for Best International Song in France. In an interview in Mexico, Christopher von Uckermann stated that it has always been an honor to be compared to Menudo and Timbiriche, but mentioned that RBD surpassed those groups by accomplishing much more in only five years, being the only Mexican group to gain worldwide fame.

The first worldwide "RBD Day" was held on October 4, 2007. The group celebrated the day with fans in Houston, Texas. During their press conference, they confirmed that their fifth album would be titled Empezar Desde Cero, produced by Carlos Lara and Armando Ávila. The first single from Empezar Desde Cero, "Inalcanzable", debuted in October 2007 and peaked at number two on Mexican charts. Empezar Desde Cero was released on November 20, debuting at number one on the Billboard Latin Albums chart and peaking within the top-ten in a variety of countries such as Brazil (their first album that did not top the charts in that country, peaking at number three) and Mexico. As of November 2008, Empezar Desde Cero had sold over a million copies worldwide. It was voted by Billboard readers as the third best album released in 2007.

In April 2008, the group performed at a concert in Brazil's capital city. The free concert was held at the city's main park and had 500,000 fans in attendance. RBD was said to be the first music act in the history of Slovenia charts to have six different albums in the top ten in the same weekend. In August 2008, the 2008 Latin Grammy nominations were announced; the group was nominated for Best Pop Album By a Duo or Group with Vocals for Empezar Desde Cero. On August 14, 2008, they released a compilation album of their greatest hits titled RBD The Best Of. 

On August 15, 2008, the group announced through a press release that they would disband in 2009.  The group's manager, Pedro Damián, explained that although there wasn't any fights among the members, it was best that they should disband for the ones who were already planning different solo activities. Herrera and Perroni were occupied with their television projects (the former with the TV series Terminales, and the latter as the protagonist of Cuidado Con El Ángel). Chávez was in the middle of a tour with the musical Avenue Q'''s Mexican stage production, and was planning to build his career as a solo artist, actor and producer. Anahí managed her own clothing store in Mexico City and began an organization to help those who have eating disorders. Dulce María was involved with shooting a film Alguién a visto a Lupita and a variety of projects, such as dubbing a cartoon character in a Mexican film. Later, Uckermann starred in the TV show Kdabra, produced by Fox in Colombia. On November 25, RBD released Best Of (in Brazil: Hits Em Português; in the United States: Greatest Hits), which was a CD/DVD that features their singles and a DVD with music videos as part of their goodbye. A Portuguese version of the album was also released.Para Olvidarte De Mí (2009) was the sixth and final album to be released by the group. The album is preceded by the only single "Para Olvidarte De Mí". On December 2, 2009, the live concert DVD, Tournée do Adeus, recorded in São Paulo was released, containing the group's last show in Brazil.

 2020: Social networks, streaming relaunch and Ser O Parecer Virtual Concert 
After years with the music of RBD out of online streaming platforms (after Universal Music bought EMI), in August 2020 the former members announced on their social media that their six studio albums and the Brazilian versions would be available in all streaming services on September 3, 2020. It was also announced that the albums will be available in stores.

To celebrate the launch of their music on streaming, the group announced a virtual show that took place on December 26 and reunited 4 of the original members: Anahí, Maite Perroni, Christian Chavez and Christopher von Uckermann. Alfonso Herrera and Dulce Maria did not take part in the reunion, with the latter confirming that she couldn't join because of her pregnancy.

A week of snippets on the band's Instagram account teasing a new song followed soon after. On Tuesday, November 17 "Siempre He Estado Aquí" was released simultaneously in all streaming platforms. The group created a TikTok challenge for the song. An animated music video was released on December 3 on the group's YouTube channel.

 2022-present: Soy Rebelde Tour 
On December 14, 2022, von Uckermann archived all of his Instagram posts and deleted his profile picture, with no explanation. A day later, Chávez did the same thing, leading fans to speculate things related to the group. That same day, fans noticed Dulce María was beginning to archive posts and found a Brazilian ticket website with a page for RBD. Soon after, Anahí archived all her posts and also removed her profile picture. She was followed by the group's official account, which did the same thing. The next day, Perroni cleansed her own Instagram page, and Dulce María finished the day after. The page T6H Entertainment also took part in this blackout.

On December 19, the band's Instagram account posted a video that included a scene from the telenovela Rebelde, intercut with footage of the five members during a dinner at Puente's house from November 20. The end of the video showed a link called "soyrebelde.mundo", where fans could register and included a countdown to January 19, 2023, with the text "Prepare your ties" written above.

Documentary about the group 
In late 2012, Pedro Damián told Televisa that the group would return to the stage in 2013. According to Damián, the project was to do something amazing and interesting, "Let's talk to them. Let's convince them to do something amazing, something interesting." He stated he was determined to revive the group and would be chatting with members and try to convince them to reunite. Following Damián's statements, Dulce María said in an interview with Televisa that it was too early for a comeback; however, she did not rule out the possibility of ever doing a reunion with her former group members. "I do not know about the future," she stated in the interview, "but right now there's no way. Each of us are focused on his or her career. It's still very early. But never say never." Around the same time, in an interview for MTV Brasil, Christian Chávez said it was possible for a reunion in 2014, which was confirmed by Damián. On July 27, 2013, however, there was no official statement from Maite Perroni, Poncho Herrera, Uckermann, Anahí, Dulce of this occurring or a set date.

With resistance from some members, Damián decided to develop a documentary about the group in celebration of the sextet's 10 year anniversary. In an interview with Televisa, Damián said he will have something more concrete on the project later in the year, "I have something like 800 hours of recordings ... We are already working."

 Members 
 Alfonso Herrera – 
 Anahí – 
 Christian Chávez – 
 Christopher von Uckermann – 
 Dulce María – 
 Maite Perroni – 

 Discography 

 Spanish discography 
Studio albums
 Rebelde (2004)
 Nuestro Amor (2005)
 Celestial (2006)
 Empezar Desde Cero (2007)
 Para Olvidarte De Mí (2009)

 Bilingual discography 
Studio albums
 Rebelde (Edição Brasil) (2005)
 Nosso Amor Rebelde (2006)
 Celestial (Versão Brasil) (2006)
 Rebels (2006)

 Tours 
 Tour Generación RBD (2005–07)
 Tour Celestial (2007–08)
 Empezar Desde Cero World Tour (2008)
 Gira del Adiós World Tour (2008)
 Soy Rebelde Tour (2023)

 2005-07: Tour Generación RBD 
Tour Generación RBD was the group's first national tour, which had 80 sold-out shows in Mexico. They visited Monterrey three times, which gathered over 150,000 fans. The tour was certified by OCESA as the fourth most rapidly sold-out tour in Mexico, behind The Cure's 2004 Sing to the Deadly Mouse Trap Tour, Britney Spears' 2002 Dream Within a Dream Tour, and Backstreet Boys' 2001 Black & Blue World Tour. The tour began on May 13, 2005, in Toluca, Mexico, and ended on December 18, 2005 in Lima, Peru. RBD's first international concerts took place in Colombia with huge success. They performed first at Medellin in front of a crowd of 30,000; later in Cali, over 50,000 were in attendance, being the group's most attended concert in Colombia, and later in Bogota. In March 2006, the second phase of the tour began in the United States, at the Los Angeles Memorial Coliseum with a crowd of over 68,000 fans – a record-breaking act for a Latin group and a sign of their widespread success. In 2006, 694,655 tickets were sold accounting for North American shows, worth a total of $23,600,000. 749,485 tickets were sold worldwide as they came in as the 14th top-selling act of 2006 worldwide.

 2007–08: Tour Celestial Tour Celestial is RBD's second tour where they performed in Latin America, the U.S., and Europe. On June 22, 2007, RBD filmed their concert in Madrid, Spain with over 40,000 fans in attendance for their DVD called Tour Celestial 2007: Hecho en España.

In early October, it was confirmed by Roptus.com that the rest of the tour would be postponed until further notice. The reason the website gave for these actions was that RBD wants to give their audience a much well-deserved show by performing some songs off their new album, Empezar desde Cero, which was released on November 20, 2007. RBD grossed $5,400,000 on North American shows and a combined total of 293,742 tickets worldwide.

 2008: Empezar Desde Cero World Tour 
In February 2008, the Empezar Desde Cero Tour began in Hildalgo, Texas, at the Dodge Arena. In late 2007, their Celestial Tour in the United States was rescheduled to February 2008 and became part of their new tour, Empezar Desde Cero Tour. Timbiriche was their opening act in the United States. The tour took place in Mexico, Brazil, Chile, Argentina, Paraguay, Spain, Slovenia, Serbia, Dominican Republic, Romania, the U.S. and many more countries in South America and Europe. RBD performed in Brazil for over 500,000 people, breaking the record by the Rolling Stones. In September, they did a series of concerts in Slovenia. The first concert was sold-out in 30 minutes, which broke records. Poll Star released the top-100 selling concerts for mid-2008

RBD came in number 49 with 166,839 tickets sold from January 1 to June 30, 2008. Third quarter sales from Pollstar ranked RBD at number 48 out of 100 with 301,015 tickets sold from January 1 to September 30. Pollstar year-end sales from January 1 to December 31, showed that RBD sold 367,346 tickets. RBD pulled in $4.4 million worth of ticket sales in from North American shows.

 2008: Gira del Adiós World Tour 
The Gira Del Adiós was a world tour by Mexican group RBD. The tour was set to visit South America, North America, and Europe, which began on November 1, 2008 and ended on December 21, 2008.

On August 14, 2008, the group RBD announced their last tour, named Gira Del Adiós (or also Tour Del Adiós). The tour initially included about 20 cities in countries such as Argentina, Colombia, Venezuela, Ecuador, Paraguay, Chile and Brazil. In November 2008, the group began the tour in the following cities: La Paz, Buenos Aires, Córdoba and Rosario. In December, RBD concerts were held in Los Angeles, Guayaquil, Quito, Lima, Santiago, Ljubljana, Bucharest, Belgrade and Madrid. The last presentation of Gira Del Adiós was on December 21, in Madrid and the final farewell of the phenomenon, RBD.

In Brazil, the tour was called "Turnê do Adeus". The first five presentations in the country were held soon after their presentations in Argentina. As in Fortaleza, Porto Alegre, Rio de Janeiro with 30,000 people and more than 25,000 in São Paulo (where they recorded their last live DVD, entitled Tournée do Adeus) and Brasília.

 2023: Soy Rebelde Tour 
The Mexican group RBD will start their Soy Rebelde Tour in El Paso, Texas on August 25, 2023, performing 30 shows across the United State. They will end their U.S. leg in October 22, 2023. After an outpouring demand from fans in Colombia, RBD announced two dates in Medellin on November 3rd and 4th at the Estadio Atanasio Girardot. After the two dates were sold out, a third and fourth date were also added. The following two shows will be held in São Paulo and Rio de Janeiro in Brazil. They will end the tour in Mexico, including 6 shows at the Foro Sol in Mexico City.

 Legacy 
RBD was one of the most important phenomenons of Latin pop culture in the 2000s despite their short transition into the music scene. The cultural phenomenon led by the soap opera Rebelde and the pop group, accompanied by advertising strategies from 2004 to 2009, resulted in recognition from a young audience who followed the career of the group, leaving a legacy of six studio albums, two TV series and multiple awards. On March 2, 2007, photos of Chávez marrying a Canadian BJ Murphy were leaked, and the singer spoke about this in a statement, officially coming out. He became the first openly gay Mexican international singer. October 4 was selected as RBD World Day, in honor of the day Rebelde'' was released in Mexico.

Fundación Sálvame 
In February 2006, thousands of RBD fans in Brazil attended an event where the six members signed merchandise and performed some of their songs. After the event concluded, a white van that was thought to contain the group was spotted leaving the area. Due to this, thousands of people ran in excitement and in the commotion, 43 people were injured and three others were killed. Later during their Celestial tour, the group spoke about the incident and stated "It is something that struck us all. No one would tell us what happened until we were on our way back to Mexico, and to know that your fans were killed at your event is a horrible feeling because you think 'Wow, they were there to see me and because of that they’re gone now' it’s such an indescribable feeling and we can’t explain how heartbroken we are". The group later confirmed they had met and spoken with the families of the victims.

The Mexican group RBD launched "Fundación Sálvame" ("Save Me Foundation", named after one of their songs) to help street children, which began on May 1, 2006. The foundation serves Mexico, Brazil, and Spain.

Awards and nominations

See also 
List of music artists and bands from Mexico
List of number-one Billboard Hot Latin Pop Airplay of 2005
List of number-one Billboard Hot Latin Pop Airplay of 2006
List of number-one Billboard Hot Latin Songs of 2006
List of number-one Billboard Latin Pop Albums from the 2000s
List of number-one Billboard Top Latin Albums of 2005
List of number-one Billboard Top Latin Albums of 2006
List of number-one Billboard Top Latin Albums of 2007
List of Latin songs on the Billboard Hot 100
List of best-selling albums in Brazil
List of best-selling albums in Mexico
List of number-one albums of 2005 (Mexico)
Top Latin Albums Year-End Chart
Top 100 Mexico

References

External links 
 
 RBD Tour 2023 On Allevents.in

 
2004 establishments in Mexico
Capitol Records artists
EMI Televisa Music artists
English-language singers from Mexico
Latin pop music groups
Teen pop groups
Co-ed groups
Musical groups disestablished in 2009
Musical groups established in 2004
Musical groups reestablished in 2020
Musical groups from Mexico City
Mexican vocal groups
Portuguese-language singers of Mexico